Karatuş is a village in the Erzincan District, Erzincan Province, Turkey. The village is populated by Kurds of the Abasan, Kurêşan and Lolan tribes and had a population of 46 in 2021.

References 

Villages in Erzincan District
Kurdish settlements in Erzincan Province